Tanzen is an extended play by Italian DJ Gigi D'Agostino, released in 1999 through EMI / BXR Noise Maker records.

Track listing
 "The Riddle" (Club Mix)
 "Your Love"
 "Passion"
 "Coca & Avana"
 "Bla Bla Bla" (Dark Remix)
 "Star"
 "Another Way"
 "A.A.A."
 "Acid"
 "One Day"
 "Movimento"
 "The Riddle" (J&B Original Dub Mix)
 "Bla Bla Bla" (Abbentenza in FM Mix)

References

Gigi D'Agostino albums
1999 EPs